Fred Warnes (born 1915) was an English professional footballer who played as a defender.

Career
Born in Tynemouth, Warnes signed for Bradford City from 'minor football' in November 1934. He made 3 league appearances for the club, scoring 1 goal, before moving to Peterborough United in June 1938. He played with Peterborough until and including the 1948–49 season.

Sources

References

1915 births
Date of death unknown
English footballers
Bradford City A.F.C. players
Peterborough United F.C. players
English Football League players
Association football defenders

Sportspeople from Tynemouth
Footballers from Tyne and Wear